David S. Eisenberg (born 15 March 1939) is an American biochemist and biophysicist best known for his contributions to structural biology and computational molecular biology, a professor at the University of California, Los Angeles since the early 1970s and director of the UCLA-DOE Institute for Genomics & Proteomics since the early 1990s, as well as a member of the California NanoSystems Institute (CNSI) at UCLA.

Education
Eisenberg attended Harvard University and graduated in 1961 with an A.B. in Biochemical Sciences. He went on to the University of Oxford, where he was awarded a D.Phil in 1965 for research supervised by Charles Coulson.

Research
Eisenberg's current research focuses on the structural biology of amyloidogenic proteins, while his computational efforts largely center on the development of bioinformatic/proteomic methodologies for elucidation and analysis of protein interaction networks. His research group hosts the Database of Interacting Proteins.

Career 
 Postdoctoral research, Princeton University (1964–1966; with Walter Kauzmann)
Postdoctoral research, California Institute of Technology (1966–1969; with Richard E. Dickerson)
 Professor, Department of Chemistry & Biochemistry, UCLA, USA (1969–Present)
 Professor, Department of Biological Chemistry, UCLA Medical School
 Director, UCLA-DOE Institute for Genomics & Proteomics (1993–Present)
 Member, California NanoSystems Institute (CNSI), UCLA
 Investigator, Howard Hughes Medical Institute (2001–Present)

Awards
He was the recipient of Harvey Prize  (Human Health) 2008 in recognition of his contributions in unfolding the structure of amyloid fibrils. The award was presented to him at a ceremony that took place on March 23, 2009 at the Technion. This recently recognized protein state provides opportunities to understand cells in health and disease.
 Was known to give out mugs.
 1961 - L.J. Henderson Prize
 1958-1960 - Harvard College Honorary Scholarships
 1961-1964 - Rhodes Scholarship
 1972-1977 - USPHS Career Development Award
 1975 - UCLA Distinguished Teaching Award
 1982 - McCoy Award of the UCLA Department of Chemistry and Biochemistry for innovative research
 1989 - Member, National Academy of Sciences (Biophysics & Computational Biology section)
 1992 - Pierce Award of the Immunotoxin Society
 1996 - Protein Society Stein & Moore Award
 1998 - American Chemical Society Repligen Corporation Award in Chemistry of Biological Processes
 2000 - Investigator, Howard Hughes Medical Institute
 2000 - Amgen Award of the Protein Society
 2001 - Fellow, American Association for the Advancement of Science
2003 - Member, American Philosophical Society
 2004 - UCLA's Seaborg Medal
 2005 - Harvard University's Westheimer Medal
 2008 - ACS Nobel Laureate Signature Award for Graduate Education in Chemistry (as preceptor, student was Rebecca Anne Nelson)
 2013 - ISCB (International Society for Computational Biology) Senior Scientist Award
 2020 - Passano Award

References 

1939 births
Living people
Harvard University alumni
Howard Hughes Medical Investigators
American biophysicists
Jewish American scientists
University of California, Los Angeles faculty
Members of the United States National Academy of Sciences
Fellows of the International Society for Computational Biology
Members of the American Philosophical Society
21st-century American Jews
Members of the National Academy of Medicine